The 2012 Polish Speedway season was the 2012 season of motorcycle speedway in Poland.

Individual

Polish Individual Speedway Championship
The 2012 Individual Speedway Polish Championship final was held on 15 August at Zielona Góra. Tomasz Jędrzejak won the Polish Championship.

Golden Helmet
The 2012 Golden Golden Helmet organised by the Polish Motor Union (PZM) was the 2012 event for the league's leading riders. The final was held at Gorzów Wielkopolski on the 5 May. Piotr Pawlicki Jr. won the Golden Helmet.

Junior Championship
 winner - Maciej Janowski

Silver Helmet
 winner - Przemysław Pawlicki

Bronze Helmet
 winner - Krystian Pieszczek

Pairs

Polish Pairs Speedway Championship
The 2012 Polish Pairs Speedway Championship was the 2012 edition of the Polish Pairs Speedway Championship. The final was held on 7 September at Leszno.

Team

Team Speedway Polish Championship
The 2012 Team Speedway Polish Championship was the 2012 edition of the Team Polish Championship. Unia Tarnów, led by American rider Greg Hancock, won the gold medal.

Ekstraliga

Play offs

1.Liga

Play offs

2.Liga

Play offs

References

Poland Individual
Poland Team
Speedway
2012 in Polish speedway